Who Goes There? and Other Stories is a 1955 collection of science fiction stories by John W. Campbell Jr., published by Dell Books in 1955. No other editions were issued.

Contents
"About John Campbell" (original essay by Theodore Sturgeon)
"Who Goes There?" (Astounding 1938)
"Twilight" (Astounding 1934)
"Night" (Astounding 1935)
"Blindness" (Astounding 1935)
"Out of Night" (Astounding 1937)
"Cloak of Aesir" (Astounding 1939)

All stories were originally published under the "Don A. Stuart" byline.

Reception
Anthony Boucher praised the collection as "stories which so admirably foretold the innovations in modern science fiction that he was later, as an editor, to evoke from other writers."

References

1955 short story collections
Books with cover art by Richard M. Powers
The Thing (franchise)